Tayler Malsam (born February 15, 1989) is an American professional stock car racing driver.

Early career
After spending time in USAC sprint cars, Malsam made his debut in the ARCA Remax Series in 2007 at Toledo Speedway. Driving for Mark Gibson, he started 8th and finished 33rd after a crash. In 2008, Malsam ran the full ARCA season in the #4 Dodge for Cunningham Motorsports, earning three top 5s and five top 10s.

NASCAR career
In 2008, Malsam made his NASCAR debut in the Camping World Truck Series race at Bristol Motor Speedway. In the #41 ThunderBoats.org Dodge owned by Carl Hartman, he would start 33rd and finished 36th. Later that year, it was announced that Malsam would run full-time in the Truck Series in 2009 for Bill Davis Racing. In preparation for 2009, Malsam ran the season finale at Homestead-Miami Speedway in the #24 Toyota and finished 21st. Prior to the start of the 2009 season, Bill Davis Racing closed its doors and Malsam was signed by Randy Moss Motorsports to run the #81 Toyota. Over the course of the season, he earned ten top 10s, including a career best finish of 5th at Gateway International Raceway and finished 12th in the final points standings.

For the 2010 season, it was announced that Malsam would run the #56 Toyota for the newly formed Kyle Busch Motorsports. After early sponsor Talking Rain was dismissed, Toyota sponsored their 2010 Truck effort. After Malsam accepted a ride in the Nationwide Series, KBM shut down the 56 team due to a lack of sponsorship. Malsam then made his Nationwide Series debut at Nashville Superspeedway, driving the Braun Racing #10 car. He would finish his Nationwide debut in 11th, although his debut would be overshadowed after a 25-point penalty was given to the team by NASCAR.

Malsam returned to the Truck Series in late 2010, driving the 25 for Randy Moss Motorsports with Exide on board. Malsam returned at Las Vegas and subsequently ran the last 3 races of the season, with a best finish of 10th at the Ford 200. It was also announced that Malsam would drive the 25 full-time in 2011. Malsam gained sponsorship from local Seattle business One Eighty, but failed to qualify at both Daytona and Phoenix. Malsam managed to finish 29th at Darlington, but RMM withdrew the #25 entry at Martinsville, later shutting down the team altogether.

For 2012, Malsam was tapped to drive the No. 19 Toyota full-time for TriStar Motorsports, securing a full season sponsorship from G-Oil. He posted a best finish of sixth in the season-opening DRIVE4COPD 300 at Daytona International Speedway, but was released from the team in late September.

In 2014, Malsam returned to NASCAR, joining Turner Scott Motorsports to drive the No. 32 Chevrolet on a limited basis in the Camping World Truck Series. He had two top 10s and three top 5s with a best finish of second at Talladega.

Images

Motorsports career results

NASCAR
(key) (Bold – Pole position awarded by qualifying time. Italics – Pole position earned by points standings or practice time. * – Most laps led.)

Nationwide Series

Camping World Truck Series

 Season still in progress
 Ineligible for series points

ARCA Re/Max Series
(key) (Bold – Pole position awarded by qualifying time. Italics – Pole position earned by points standings or practice time. * – Most laps led.)

References

External links

 
 

Living people
1989 births
Racing drivers from Seattle
NASCAR drivers
ARCA Menards Series drivers
Kyle Busch Motorsports drivers